Mahfuzur Rahaman Mita is a businessman and a politician of  Bangladesh Awami League and the incumbent member of parliament from Chittagong-3.

Early life
Mahfuzur Rahaman was born on 1 June 1970. Kuciyamora, Bauriya Union , Sandwip, Chittagong, Bangladesh. He is the eldest son of Dipbondhu Alhajj Mustafizur Rahman (Father) and Mohsena Ara Begum (Mother). He has a master's degree in communication. He is the chairperson of Rupali Life Insurance and the director of Sonar Bangla.

Career
Mahfuzur Rahman Mita is a businessman and politician of Bangladesh Awami League. He is a Member of Parliament elected from Constituency No. 280 (Chittagong-3) in the 2014 and 2018 National parliament elections and a member of the Parliamentary Standing Committee on the Ministry of Shipping in the Eleventh National parliament.

References

Awami League politicians
Living people
1970 births
10th Jatiya Sangsad members
11th Jatiya Sangsad members
People from Sandwip Upazila